WSSD (88.1 MHz, "The Blues Station") was a non-commercial radio station licensed for Chicago, Illinois, United States.  It was an all-blues station and its 10 watt signal covered only the South Side of Chicago.

The station went silent for technical upgrades on June 25, 2014.  In October 2015, the Federal Communications Commission sent a letter to the station that its license expired as a matter of law for not returning to the air by June 2015; the letter was returned undelivered.  The FCC deleted the WSSD call sign on November 18, 2015.

References

External links
 

SSD
Blues radio stations
Defunct radio stations in the United States
Radio stations disestablished in 2015
2015 disestablishments in Illinois
SSD
Radio stations established in 1980
1980 establishments in Illinois